The Parent Agency is a children's fiction novel written by David Baddiel and illustrated by Jim Field. It was published on 9 October 2014 by HarperCollins Children's Books. The book follows a 9-year-old boy named Barry Bennett, who gets transported to an alternate universe where children choose their parents. A film adaptation is currently in the works.

Synopsis 
James Bond and FC Barcelona fan Barry Bennett gets transported to 'United Kid-dom' in an alternate universe where kids choose their parents, after Barry wished he had better parents. He encounters his friends Jake, Lucas and Taj (with different names) working at 'The Parent Agency' in 'Youngdon', where he discovers that everyone has to find parents before their tenth birthday. With his in 5 days time, Barry is assigned to 5 different sets of parents (one on each day), before deciding he prefers his original parents, being transported back to them on his tenth birthday.

Characters 

 Barry Bennett - the protagonist of the book. He is transported into an alternate universe where kids choose their parents.
 The Sisterly/Secretary Entity (Ginny and Kay Bennett/Bustle) [TSE] - Barry's twin sisters, whom he refers to as one entity. They work at The Parent Agency in the alternate universe, with their (alternate universe) parents being Barry's fifth set of trial parents, where he saves TSE from choking.
 Jake, Lucas and Taj - Barry's friends who work at The Parent Agency in the alternate universe, with Jake 'The Head' of the agency, and Lucas and Taj as PCs (Parent Controllers) 890 and 891.
 Susan and Geoff Bennett - Barry's parents. Barry has a list of 'things [he] blames [his] parents for'.
 Lord and Lady Rader-Wellorff - Barry's first set of trial parents, under the criteria 'rich'. They live at Bottomley Hall in the village of 'Bottomley Bottom' with their butler Peevish and eight children (Jeremy, Teremy, Meremy, Heremy, Queremy, Smellemy, Sea Anemone and Dave). He goes back to The Parent Agency after a grouse shoot.
 Vlad Mitt and Morrissina Padada [Vlassorina] - Barry's second set of trial parents, under the criteria 'famous'. They live in a massive private tower complex called 'Vlassopolis'. They take him to the premiere of Death in the Car 5, at which Vlassorina ask him to change his name to Barrissina, to which he refuses, asking to be taken back to The Parent Agency.
 Derek and Emily Fwahm!  - Barry's third set of trial parents, under the criteria 'fit and strong ... never get tired'. They insist on having their surname italicised and with an exclamation mark. They live in a gym, with TVs powered by treadmills. As the fitness trainers on the United Kid-dom football team, they get Barry on the team, where his team mates are the Rader-Wellorff children (due to their father being the head of the FA), along with Lionel Tidy (parody of Lionel Messi).
 Elliott and Mama Cool - Barry's fourth set of trial parents, under the criteria 'parents who let me do whatever I want'. They use 'like' in every sentence. They live in a tent on the Bottomley Hall estate, with their dog, Neil. They ask Barry to go back to The Parents Agency after a game of Animal Car Wars and Barry is sick on them.
 Marjorie and Malcolm Bustle - Barry's fifth set of trial parents, who are also The Secretary Entity's parents in the alternate universe. He saves TSE from choking after putting salt and pepper in his birthday cake from Marjorie and Malcolm and getting TSE to eat it. He goes back to The Parent Agency after feeling bad about this.

Background 
Baddiel was inspired to write the book after a conversation with his nine-year-old son, Ezra. After visiting a Harry Potter exhibition, Ezra asked his father 'Dad, why didn’t Harry run away from the Dursleys and go and find some better parents?' This inspired Baddiel to write the book.

Reception 
The Parent Agency received positive praise from editorials such as The Guardian and HuffPost UK, while The Independent critiqued it, saying that '[Baddiel] just tries too hard to be funny'.

Adaptation 
In 2016, Deadline reported that Fox 2000 Pictures had acquired the film rights to The Parent Agency, to be produced by Snowed-In Productions.

Awards

References

External links 

 The Parent Agency - HarperCollins

2014 British novels
2014 children's books
British children's novels
HarperCollins books